The Netherlands Football League Championship 1955–1956 was contested by 36 teams participating in two divisions. The national champion would be determined by a play-off featuring the two best placed teams in both divisions of the Netherlands. Rapid JC won this year's championship by beating NAC, Elinkwijk and Sparta Rotterdam.

New entrant
SHS

Divisions

Hoofdklasse A

Table

Results

Hoofdklasse B

Table

Results

Promotion play-off

Rapid qualify for the Championship play-offs.

Relegation play-off

DFC are relegated to Eerste Divisie.

Championship play-off

References
Netherlands professional football season '55/56

Netherlands Football League Championship seasons
1955–56 in Dutch football
Neth